Palegara is a 1996 Indian Kannada-language film, directed by N. Omprakash Rao and produced by S. V. S. Chinni and M. K. Prakash. The film stars Ambareesh, Khushbu, Nirosha and Srikanya. The film has musical score by Hamsalekha.

Cast

Ambareesh
Khushbu
Nirosha
Srikanya
Anandaraj
Dheerendra Gopal
Manu
Rajanand
Brahmavar
Madhukar
Shobhraj
Venki
Dharanendraiah
Gangadhar
Sarigama Viji
Tennis Krishna
Shani Mahadevappa
B. V. Radha
Poojitha
Anuja
Vanishree
Jyothi
Prema
Vajramuni in guest appearance

Soundtrack

The music was composed by Naadabrahma Hamsalekha.

References

1996 films
1990s Kannada-language films
Films scored by Hamsalekha